Fern Lake is an alpine lake in Larimer County, Colorado, United States. It is a major source for the Big Thompson River.

External links

Lakes of Rocky Mountain National Park
Lakes of Larimer County, Colorado